Hershey House, also known as the Patrick Home, is a historic home located in Perry Township, Tippecanoe County, Indiana.  It was built in 1856, and is a two-story, Greek Revival style brick dwelling, with a -story rear wing. It is three bays wide and has a gable front roof.  Also on the property is a contributing fieldstone milk house.  It was the home of William Hershey, son of the builder Joseph M. Hershey, who served with the 16th Independent Battery Indiana Light Artillery in the American Civil War and witnessed the assassination of Abraham Lincoln.

It was listed on the National Register of Historic Places in 1978.

References

Houses on the National Register of Historic Places in Indiana
Greek Revival houses in Indiana
Houses completed in 1856
Houses in Tippecanoe County, Indiana
National Register of Historic Places in Tippecanoe County, Indiana